Municipality of Culiacán is a municipality in Sinaloa in northwestern Mexico.

The municipal seat is the city of Culiacán.

Political subdivision 
Culiacán Municipality is subdivided into 18 sindicaturas:
El Salado
Higueras de Abuya
Baila
Aguaruto
Emiliano Zapata
Adolfo López Mateos (El Tamarindo)
Jesús María
Las Tapias
Quilá
Sanalona
San Lorenzo
Tacuichamona
Tepuche
Imala
Costa Rica
Culiacancito
Eldorado
Las Flechas

See also
Culiacán
Aguaruto

References

Municipalities of Sinaloa